New York City is home to many bridges and tunnels. Several agencies manage this network of crossings. The New York City Department of Transportation owns and operates almost 800. The Metropolitan Transportation Authority, Port Authority of New York and New Jersey, New York State Department of Transportation and Amtrak have many others.

Many of the city's major bridges and tunnels have broken or set records. Opened in 1927, the Holland Tunnel was the world's first mechanically ventilated underwater vehicular tunnel. The Brooklyn Bridge, Williamsburg Bridge, George Washington Bridge, and Verrazzano-Narrows Bridge were the world's longest suspension bridges when opened in 1883, 1903, 1931, and 1964 respectively. There are 789 bridges and tunnels in New York.

Bridges
New York City's crossings date back to 1693, when its first bridge, known as the King's Bridge, was constructed over Spuyten Duyvil Creek between Manhattan and the Bronx, located in the present-day Kingsbridge neighborhood. The bridge, composed of stone abutments and a timber deck, was demolished in 1917. The oldest crossing still standing is High Bridge, built 1848 to carry the Croton Aqueduct from Manhattan to the Bronx over the Harlem River. This bridge was built to carry water to the city as part of the Croton Aqueduct system.

Ten bridges and one tunnel serving the city have been awarded some level of landmark status. The Holland Tunnel was designated a National Historic Landmark in 1993 in recognition of its pioneering role as the first mechanically ventilated vehicular underwater tunnel, operating since 1927. The George Washington, High, Hell Gate, Queensboro, Brooklyn, Manhattan, Macombs Dam, Carroll Street, University Heights, and Washington Bridges have all received landmark status, as well.

New York features bridges of many lengths and types, carrying vehicular, bicycle, pedestrian, and subway traffic. The George Washington Bridge, spanning the Hudson River between New York City and Fort Lee, New Jersey, is the world's busiest bridge in terms of vehicular traffic. The George Washington, Verrazzano-Narrows, and Brooklyn Bridges are noted for their architecture, while others are more well known for their functional importance, such as the Williamsburg Bridge with 8 vehicular lanes, 2 subway tracks, a bike lane, and pedestrian walkways.

Bridges by water body

East River

From south to north:

Harlem River

From south to north, east to west:

Hudson River

New York Bay

Newtown Creek

Other

The Bronx

Brooklyn

Queens

Staten Island

Tunnels

Each of the tunnels that run underneath the East and Hudson Rivers were marvels of engineering when first constructed. The Holland Tunnel is the oldest of the vehicular tunnels, opening to great fanfare in 1927 as the first mechanically ventilated underwater tunnel. The Queens Midtown Tunnel was opened in 1940 to relieve the congestion on the city's bridges. Each of its tubes were designed  wider than the Holland Tunnel in order to accommodate the wider cars of the period. When the Brooklyn–Battery Tunnel opened in 1950, it was the longest continuous underwater vehicular tunnel in North America, a title it still holds. The Lincoln Tunnel has three tubes linking midtown Manhattan to New Jersey, a configuration that provides the flexibility to provide four lanes in one direction during rush hours, or three lanes in both direction.

All four underwater road tunnels were built by Ole Singstad: the Holland Tunnel's original chief engineer Clifford Milburn Holland died, as did his successor, Milton H. Freeman, after which Singstad became chief engineer, finishing the Holland Tunnel and then building the remaining tunnels.

East River

From south to north:

Harlem River
From south to north:

Hudson River
From south to north:

Newtown Creek

Bridges and tunnels spanning land only

 Park Avenue Tunnel (33rd–40th Streets), Park Avenue Viaduct, and  Park Avenue Tunnel (45th–97th Streets), Manhattan
 Battery Park Underpass, Manhattan
 Cobble Hill Tunnel, Brooklyn
 First Avenue Tunnel from 42nd Street to 47th Street, Manhattan
 Seeley Street Bridge over Prospect Avenue, Brooklyn
 Trinity Place Bridge, Manhattan
 Seneca Village Tunnel at 85th St., Central Park
 Glade Arch bridge, between 77th and 78th Sts., Central Park
 Subway tunnel, between 57th Street off 7th Avenue, 63rd Street, and Lexington Avenue, Central Park (F and Q)

Bridges and tunnels by use 

The relative average number of inbound vehicles between 5 a.m. and 11 a.m. to Midtown and Lower Manhattan is:

 Queensboro Bridge: 31,000
 Lincoln Tunnel: 25,944
 Brooklyn Bridge: 22,241
 Williamsburg Bridge: 18,339
 Queens-Midtown Tunnel: 17,968
 Holland Tunnel: 16,257
 Brooklyn Battery Tunnel: 14,496
 Manhattan Bridge: 13,818

See also
List of bridges documented by the Historic American Engineering Record in New York (state)
List of tunnels documented by the Historic American Engineering Record in New York (state)
List of fixed crossings of the East River
List of crossings of the Harlem River
List of fixed crossings of the Hudson River
List of bridges in Pittsburgh

References

 New York City Department of Transportation (NYCDOT). "Movable Bridges in the Bronx." Accessed 2015-08-25.

External links 

 Bridge information
 Bridges by use
 NYC DOT list of movable bridges
 Bridges NYC [history of bridges in New York City and surrounding areas]

 
 
Port of New York and New Jersey
N
N
New York City
Lists of buildings and structures in New York City
New York City-related lists